The Chief of Ordnance of the United States Army is a general officer who is responsible for the Army Ordnance Corps and serves as the Commandant of the U.S. Army Ordnance School at Fort Lee, Virginia. The Chief of Ordnance is primarily focused on the doctrine, training, and professional development of Ordnance officers and soldiers. The position was created simultaneously with the establishment of the Army Ordnance Department on May 14, 1812.

History

18th century
The American Revolution established the general outlines of the future Ordnance Department. The Continental Congress' Board for War and Ordnance created the Commissary General for Military Stores to establish and operate ordnance facilities in an effort to alleviate the dependence on foreign arms and munitions. Colonel Benjamin Flower led the Commissary from his appointment in January 1775 until his death in May 1781. Ordnance facilities were established at Springfield, Massachusetts and Carlisle, Pennsylvania for the production of arms, powder, and shot. After the war, the logistic elements were disbanded and the authority for procurement and provision of all things military was transferred to the Office of the Purveyor of Public Supplies located within the Treasury Department.

19th century
By the dawn of the War of 1812, the Secretary of War recognized the need for a distinct branch to manage the procurement, research, and maintenance of Ordnance materiel. Decius Wadsworth, previously superintendent of West Point, was appointed a Colonel and given the title Commissary General of Ordnance, later changed to Chief of Ordnance. His ambition, during the war years and afterward, was to simplify and streamline Ordnance materiel management. His staff worked to reduce the variety of small arms and artillery pieces to a few efficient models. In addition, he aimed to develop a cadre of highly trained Ordnance officers who could dedicate their inventive ingenuity to their profession.

20th century
Between 1906 and 1915 Chief of Ordnance Brig. Gen. William Crozier's attempted to introduce scientific management systems into his department. With industrial productivity receiving national attention through the efforts of Frederick Taylor and others, Crozier sought favorable comparisons with private industry in his Congressional relations. Strikes at the Watertown Arsenal and Rock Island Arsenal limited the use of time studies and piece rates in the department, but at Springfield Arsenal a century's development of piece rates precluded the need for such studies or conflict. New Armory practices borrowed or influenced by Taylorism included centralized planning for better routing of tasks and components, improved accounting systems for tools and raw materials, introduction of high-speed tool steels, and reorganization of shop floors. By 1915, Armory managers also obtained substantial amounts of new equipment and completed direct rail links from the Armories to trunk lines. Better on-site transportation, along with increased use of electrical power and rebuilt power transmission systems, removed most of the Armory's long-standing geographic and power supply limitations. Capital improvements, and new accounting practices to control manufacturing materials purchases, had significant effects in reducing production costs, but still left the Army with a limited capacity to respond to a major conflict. But Crozier had problems obtaining budget too.

Ordnance Department supply failures during the first months of formal American involvement in the First World War cost Crozier his job, despite several attempts at wholesale departmental reorganization along functional lines with decentralized districts. In part by delegating more authority to district civilian managers, Crozier's successor, Maj. Gen. Clarence C. Williams (Chief of Ordnance, 1918-30), succeeded in gaining on ordnance supply problems as the war ended, by which time the department's reputation remained clouded.

Following the massive reorganization of the Army in 1962 based on the Hoelscher Committee Report, the Ordnance Corps and the office of the Chief of Ordnance was disestablished. The Ordnance branch continued under the direction of the Army’s Deputy Chief of Staff for Logistics. Army Materiel Command assumed responsibility for many of the Ordnance Corps historical functions; research, development, procurement, production, storage and technical intelligence.

In 1985, the Ordnance Corps became the first of the Army’s support elements to re-establish itself under the branch regimental concept. The Office of the Chief of Ordnance was reestablished and regained responsibility for decisions concerning personnel, force structure, doctrine, and training. This change gave the opportunity for Ordnance officers, soldiers, and civilians to identify with their historical predecessors in their mission of Ordnance support to the U.S. Army.

21st century
In accordance with the 2005 Base Closure and Realignment Commission, the U.S. Army Ordnance School and the Chief of Ordnance moved from Aberdeen Proving Ground, Maryland to Fort Lee, Virginia.

List of Army Chiefs of Ordnance

Acting Chiefs
The following individuals have served as acting Chief of Ordnance:

Major Charles Shaler. Shaler served from 29 March to 5 April 1899, after the death of Daniel Flagler and before Adelbert Buffington.
Colonel Rogers Birnie. Birnie served while William Crozier served as President of the Army War College during the 1912-1913 academic year.
Brigadier General Charles B. Wheeler. Wheeler served from 20 December 1917 to 19 April 1918.
Brigadier General William S. Peirce. Peirce served from 19 April until 2 May 1918.
Brigadier General Colden L'Hommedieu Ruggles. Ruggles served from 1 April to 3 June 1930.

References

Bibliography

External links

U.S. Army Ordnance Corps Official Website

United States Army